The Institute of Yilan County History (IOYCH) is a local institute of history in Yilan City, Yilan County, Taiwan built to collect, access, record, research and promote the local history of Yilan County.

History
IOYCH was originally established on 1 January 1992 and was inaugurated on 16 October 1993. It was moved to its current place on 16 October 2001.

Exhibitions
The institute exhibits collections pertaining the local history of Yilan and also genealogy and artifacts of the local population.

Activities
The institute regularly holds exhibitions, symposiums, seminars and forums about the research of Yilan County.

See also
 List of tourist attractions in Taiwan

References

External links

  

1992 establishments in Taiwan
Buildings and structures in Yilan County, Taiwan
Research institutes established in 1992
Research institutes in Taiwan
Tourist attractions in Yilan County, Taiwan